Cui Wei may refer to:
Cui Wei (footballer, born 1983), Chinese footballer from Beijing, who plays for Beijing Institute of Technology F.C.
Cui Wei (footballer, born 1994), Chinese footballer from Shandong, who plays for Shandong Luneng Taishan F.C.